Guo Wei (郭威) (904–954) was the Chinese emperor of the Later Zhou dynasty.

Guo Wei may also refer to:
Guo Wei (ice hockey) (born 1969), Chinese ice hockey player
Guo Wei (parathlete) (born 1982), Chinese Paralympic athlete
Guo Wei (speed skater) (born 1983), Chinese short track speed skater
Guo Wei (businessman) (born 1975), Chinese senior executive of Internet and Media for Kaixin001
Way Kuo or Guo Wei (郭位; born 1951), Taiwanese professor at City University of Hong Kong
Guo Wei (footballer) (born 1989), Chinese footballer